Melanimon is a genus of beetles belonging to the family Tenebrionidae.

The species of this genus are found in Europe.

Species:
 Melanimon amalitae Ferrer & Castro Tovar, 2010 
 Melanimon inermus Picka, 1983

References

Tenebrionidae